The 2012 United States House of Representatives election in South Dakota was held on Tuesday, November 6, 2012, to elect the single U.S. Representative from South Dakota's At-large congressional district, comprising the entire state of South Dakota. The election coincided with the elections of other federal and state offices, including a quadrennial presidential election.

Republican primary

Candidates
 Kristi Noem, incumbent U.S. Representative

Democratic primary

Candidates
 Jeff Barth, Minnehaha County Commissioner
 Matt Varilek, staffer for Senator Tim Johnson

Declined
 Stephanie Herseth Sandlin, former U.S. Representative

Primary results

General election

Polling

Results

References

External links
 Elections from the South Dakota Secretary of State
 United States House of Representatives elections in South Dakota, 2012 at Ballotpedia
 South Dakota - At-Large from OurCampaigns.com
 Campaign contributions from OpenSecrets
 Outside spending at the Sunlight Foundation

Official campaign websites (Archived)
 Kristi Noem campaign website
 Matt Varilek campaign website

South Dakota
2012
United States House of Representatives